Giralia Station, often referred to as Giralia, is a pastoral lease that operates as a sheep station.

The property shares boundaries with Marrilla, Bullara, and Yanrey Stations; it also has frontage onto Exmouth Gulf.

Construction of a homestead commenced in 1910, and it was extended to its present size in 1916. By 1930 the property was carrying a flock of 44,000 sheep and produced a clip of 700 bales of wool during shearing.

Giralia turned to tourist accommodation after being acquired by the Department of Conservation and Land Management in 2002 and has been managed as a national park. The Blake family remain on the property to run the tourist venue. In 2011, a massive bushfire that consumed an area of  came to within  of the homestead.

See also
 List of pastoral leases in Western Australia

References

Shire of Exmouth
Pastoral leases in Western Australia
Stations (Australian agriculture)
1888 establishments in Australia